St Mary Magdalene Academy is an academy on Liverpool Road, London.

St Mary Magdalene Academy opened in 2007 and over the past decade has established itself as a high achieving North London school.
Examination Results are consistently strong at GCSE and A Level.

External links
https://www.goodschoolsguide.co.uk/schools/st-mary-magdalene-academy-london
St Mary Magdalene Academy

Academies in the London Borough of Islington
Secondary schools in the London Borough of Islington
Church of England secondary schools in the Diocese of London
Church of England primary schools in the Diocese of London
Primary schools in the London Borough of Islington